Afghanistan's Children - A New Approach (ASCHIANA) ( Ašiyānā, meaning "the nest") is an Afghan nongovernmental organisation that has provided services, support and programs to working street children and their families since 1995. ASCHIANA currently serves 4,500 students in Afghanistan through centers in Kabul, Mazar-i-Sharif, Herat and Parwan. ASCHIANA operates four centres in Kabul: two centres for basic education, one centre for accelerated girls' education and one emergency shelter for runaway children (with day care and basic education). ASCHIANA also provides basic education for internally displaced persons and returned refugees through five outreach areas in Kabul.

Work
ASCHIANA works together with Afghanistan's Ministry of Education, Ministry of Social Affairs and the Afghan National Police to help children on the street receive a basic education—in Dari, Pashto, English, mathematics, Islamic Education, health education, mine awareness, drug awareness and children's rights—and integrate into the formal school system.

ASCHIANA students also enjoy recreational activities through sports, music and art, and receive training in skills such as carpentry, woodworking, cosmetology, tailoring, painting, instrument making, electrical engineering and plumbing. ASCHIANA also provides health, financial and social support for students and their families.

ASCHIANA's students work on the streets to provide an income for their families. Many of them have lost one or both parents and have become their household's main source of income. ASCHIANA's goals are to support these children and their families:

 by providing a basic education, school supplies and a warm meal;
 by offering children a safe environment to learn and develop;
 by promoting safe, well-informed livelihoods;
 by building children's capacities through social and vocational skills training, and;
 by giving street-working children an opportunity to pursue further education.

Reception
ASCHIANA's work has been highlighted in research by Terre des Hommes and the Afghanistan Research and Evaluation Unit (AREU) and has received support for its operations from  Roshan and Siemens (among other sources).

References
 New York Times How to Help Kabul's Refugees Retrieved March 2015.
 New York Times Driven Away by a War, Now Stalked by Winter’s Cold Retrieved March 2015.

 William Lambers' Blog WFP and Aschiana Provide Food for Street Children in Afghanistan Retrieved March 2015.
 Aschiana Official Site Aschiana in the News Retrieved March 2015.
 BBC News The harsh lives of Kabul's street children Retrieved March 2015.
 Coghlan, Tom. "Kabul street children may lose nest." BBC News. 13 April 2005.  (accessed 12 September 2008).
 Foster, David. "Teaching Kabul's Street Children." Al Jazeera. 21 May 2007. (accessed 12 September 2008).
 "Roshan and Siemens provide Afa. 5.0 Million to support Aschiana." www.afghanmania.com. 12 July 2006. (accessed 12 September 2008).
 "Ambassador Said T. Jawad Applauds ASCHIANA Foundation and Germany for their Contributions to Afghanistan." Embassy of Afghanistan, Washington D.C. 25 May 2007.  (accessed 12 September 2008).

External links
 Aschiana Official Site
 Friends of ASCHIANA (UK)
 TDH Afghanistan (Aschiana Page)
 "Needs Assessment of Children Working in the Streets of Kabul." Kabul: Swiss Foundation of Terre des Hommes, ASCHIANA Street Children Project and Central Statistics Office of Afghanistan, 2002.
 2 Travel a Dirt Road documentary on ASCHIANA
 "Factors Influencing Decisions to Use Child Labour: A Case Study of Poor Households in Kabul", by Paula Kantor and Anastasiya Hozyainova, AREU

Society of Afghanistan
Children's rights organizations
Child-related organisations in Afghanistan
Educational organisations based in Afghanistan
1995 establishments in Afghanistan
Runaway (dependent)